Mitino District  is an administrative district (raion) of North-Western Administrative Okrug, and one of the 125 raions of Moscow, Russia. It is just outside the Moscow Ring Road, 17 km northwest of the centre of Moscow. Population: 183,000 (2017 est.);--> (2002 Census);

History
Located in the outskirts of Moscow, the original village of Mitino merged into the city in 1985. Mass housing development in the area began in 1992. Mitino was built up with the same type of 17-storey houses, as well as several 4-, 5-, 6-, 9-, 14- and 21-storey residential buildings. Mitino became one of the most prestigious districts of Moscow due to its good environmental conditions and developed infrastructure. In December 26, 2009 was constructed Mitino metro station of Arbatsko-Pokrovskaya line that made transport situation in district better.

See also
 Mitino (Moscow Metro)
Administrative divisions of Moscow

References

Notes

Sources

External links

Districts of Moscow
North-Western Administrative Okrug